Damji Padamshi Pathshala is a Jain teaching institution located in Dadar, Mumbai, India.

History 
The institution was established in 1940.

The 50 years celebration was organised in 1990 at the Ravindra Natya Mandir, Prabhadevi, Mumbai.

The 75 years celebration was organised at the Yashwantrao Chavan Auditorium in Dadar.

Organization 
Entry and education is provided without costs; finances are managed by a religious trust by the name Om Shri Dadar Aradhna Bhavan Jain Sangh.

The institute has about a hundred students. According to the institution, more than fifty of their students have accepted Diksha.

Teachers

Current Teachers
 Kumudben (Full Time)
 RekhaBen (Full Time)
 KinjalBen (Ful Time)
 Ankit Sir (Part Time)
 Kamalesh Sir (Part Time Honorary)

Past Teachers
 Chandubhai Shah
 Prabhudasbhai
 Veljibhai Bhansali

Activities
The institute teaches Jain Sutras and Artha. They also conduct religious ceremonies and rituals.

The institution has led twenty religious tours throughout India. Religious pilgrimages are conducted for a week each year in December in locations such as Gujarat, Rajasthan, Madhya Pradesh, Punjab, and Uttar Pradesh.

Pathshala is affiliated to the Dharmik Shikshan Sangh which organises the annual examination. About a hundred students appear for examinations each year at 22 different levels. The annual day is then held for celebration and prize distribution.

Accolades
In 2000 the institute received the Best Pathshala Award out of the 250 pathshalas located in Mumbai and affiliated to the Jain Dharmik Shikshan Sangh.

References

Jain organisations